Heterotheca barbata, the Spokane false goldenaster, is a very rare North American species of flowering plant in the family Asteraceae. It has been found only in the northwestern United States, in eastern Washington and northern Idaho.

References

barbata
Flora of Washington (state)
Flora of Idaho
Plants described in 1910
Flora without expected TNC conservation status